Bybee is an unincorporated community in Madison County, Kentucky, United States. It was named Bybeetown in 1859, Its post office was established in July 1902, and it closed in 1977. It is on Kentucky Route 52 east of Waco.

The town was named after the Bybee Family,

References

Unincorporated communities in Madison County, Kentucky
Unincorporated communities in Kentucky